Han Eun-jung also known as Han Da-Gam (born July 10, 1980) is a South Korean comedienne and actress. She is known for Successful Story of a Bright Girl (2002), Full House (2004) and Two Guys (2004).

Filmography

Television series

Film

Music video

Variety show

Web shows

Awards and nominations

References

External links 
 
 
 

1980 births
IHQ (company) artists
Living people
South Korean television actresses
South Korean film actresses